Maker of Men  is a 1931 American pre-Code sports melodrama film directed by Edward Sedgwick and written by Howard J. Green and Edward Sedgwick. Produced by Columbia Pictures Corporation, the film stars Jack Holt, Richard Cromwell, and Joan Marsh. It also features John Wayne in a supporting role.

Plot
Coach Dudley is a hard-driving college football coach, who strives to shape the character of his players, transforming them into real men. Unfortunately, the Coach's son, Bob, who plays for him, hates sports and participates only because he is forced to do so. Bob lets his team down through cowardice and laziness and as a result is rejected by his father, his college sweetheart Dorothy, and his school. Bob joins a rival college team with the plan to defeat his father's team. In the end, Bob pulls himself together to win the Big Game, proving himself worthy of his father's name.

Cast
Jack Holt as Coach Dudley
Richard Cromwell as Bob Dudley
Joan Marsh as Dorothy
John Wayne as Dusty Rhodes
Natalie Moorhead as Mrs. Rhodes
Richard Tucker as Mr. Rhodes
Walter Catlett as McNeil
Ethel Wales as Aunt Martha
LeRoy Mason as Chick (as Robert Alden)
Paul Hurst as Gabby

See also
 John Wayne filmography

External links

BFI
Answers.com
The New York Times

1931 films
American football films
American black-and-white films
Columbia Pictures films
1931 drama films
1930s English-language films
Films directed by Edward Sedgwick
Melodrama films
1930s American films
1930s sports drama films
American sports drama films